Vandana Pandurang Shanbhag (born 19 September 1965) is a female Indian former track and field athlete who represented India at the 1988 Olympics in the 4 x 400 metres relay race.  She is also a Kho-kho  player.  She won the silver medal in the women's 400 metres race at the 1987 Asian Athletics Championships held in Singapore. She was honoured with the Arjuna Award for outstanding achievement in Indian sports.

She is married, has a daughter and is settled in Mangalore.

References
 sports-reference
 Asian Championships from GBR Athletics

Living people
1965 births
Indian female sprinters
Olympic athletes of India
Athletes (track and field) at the 1988 Summer Olympics
Sportswomen from Karnataka
Sportspeople from Mangalore
Recipients of the Arjuna Award
Indian female middle-distance runners
20th-century Indian women
20th-century Indian people
Athletes from Karnataka
Olympic female sprinters